Gary Cziko is an American researcher, and author in the field of educational psychology at the University of Illinois at Urbana–Champaign who has worked on the philosophical model known as perceptual control theory (PCT) – a model whose original developer, William T. Powers, was his mentor. He has written two introductory books on the subject, and in 1995 he introduced the concept of  "universal selectionism" into the PCT model.

Education and career 

Cziko received a Bachelor of Arts degree in psychology from Queens College, City University of New York, a Master of Arts degree in psychology from McGill University  in Montreal, Quebec, Canada, in 1975, and a Doctor of Philosophy (Ph.D.) from McGill University in 1978.
He was a post-doctoral research fellow for the Quebec Ministry of Education at the University of Montreal during 1978–79. Since 1979, Cziko has been on the faculty of the University of Illinois at Urbana–Champaign. He became an associate professor in 1986 and a full professor in 1998.

Selected publications 
In 1989, Cziko published one of his first academic papers relating to PCT:

He has also authored two introductions to PCT, both published by MIT Press:

Awards and recognitions 

In 2008, Cziko was a Fulbright Scholar in Chile.

References 

Educational psychologists
Living people
Queens College, City University of New York alumni
McGill University Faculty of Science alumni
University of Illinois Urbana-Champaign faculty
Year of birth missing (living people)
American educational psychologists